The law of New Zealand uses the English common law system, inherited from being a part of the British Empire. 

There are several sources of law, the primary ones being statutes enacted by the New Zealand Parliament and case law made by decisions of the courts of New Zealand. At a more fundamental level, the law of New Zealand is based on three related principles: parliamentary sovereignty; the rule of law; and the separation of powers.

History

Pre-European law
Before colonisation by the British, Māori customary law (tikanga) would have served as rule of law for most tribes. 

The first mention of New Zealand in British statutes is in the Murders Abroad Act of 1817, which clarified that New Zealand was not a British colony (despite being claimed by Captain Cook) and "not within His Majesty's dominions".

Treaty of Waitangi

The Treaty of Waitangi, signed in 1840, is widely believed to have established British law in New Zealand. There are numerous problems with this theory. Firstly, the Māori and English language versions of the Treaty are substantially different. The English version transfers sovereignty to Queen Victoria (in clause one) and grants Māori the rights of British subjects (in clause three). Although no specific mention is made in the Treaty of any legal system, these two clauses seem to imply that British law would be established in New Zealand. The Māori version, however, states that Victoria receives kawanatanga (governorship) while the chiefs retain tino rangatiratanga (absolute chieftainship) in clause two as opposed to the property rights promised in the English version. Although the third clause of the Māori version says that the Queen would treat Māori the same as people in England, many historians argue that Māori believed that the new governor would exercise his powers over the Europeans only, and that the chiefs would continue to rule over Māori. In the eyes of some modern Māori, the New Zealand legal system is invalid as it violates the Treaty's promise of tino rangatiratanga (chieftainship).

Another problem with the idea that the Treaty established the rule of British law is that in 1840 Māori still controlled New Zealand. Although the British had sent a governor, they had not backed him up with troops and for the first few years of supposed British sovereignty, Europeans were significantly outnumbered and outgunned by Māori. Māori generally obeyed British law in European settlements and when they or their chiefs chose to, but there was nothing to make them obey the law in areas they controlled, which until about the 1860s was most of the country. British law, and later New Zealand law as passed by the New Zealand Parliament was slowly established over the country, but it remained ineffective in Māori-controlled areas until the late nineteenth century at least. In practical terms, British-based law was established in New Zealand not through the Treaty of Waitangi but through conquest and settlement.

Although the Treaty had never been incorporated into New Zealand municipal law, its provisions were first incorporated into legislation as early as the Land Claims Ordinance 1841 and the Native Rights Act 1865. However, in the 1877 Wi Parata v Bishop of Wellington judgement, Judge Prendergast argued that the Treaty was a "simple nullity" in terms of transferring sovereignty from Māori to the United Kingdom. This remained the legal orthodoxy until at least the 1970s. Māori have since argued that Prendergast's decision, as well as laws later based on it were a politically convenient and deliberate ploy to legitimise the seizure of Māori land and other resources.

The Treaty finally received limited recognition in 1975 with the passage of the Treaty of Waitangi Act 1975, which established the Waitangi Tribunal, but this initially had very limited powers to make findings of facts and recommendations only. The Act was amended in 1985 to enable it to investigate Treaty breaches back to 1840, and also to increase the Tribunal membership. The membership was further increased in another amendment in 1988.

The Treaty was incorporated in a limited way into New Zealand law by the State Owned Enterprises Act 1986. Section 9 of the act said "Nothing in this Act shall permit the Crown to act in a manner that is inconsistent with the principles of the Treaty of Waitangi". The government had proposed a transfer of assets from former Government departments to state-owned enterprises, but because the state-owned enterprises were essentially private firms owned by the government, there was an argument that they would prevent assets which had been given by Māori for use by the state from being returned to Māori by the Waitangi Tribunal and through Treaty settlements. The Act was challenged in court in 1987, and the judgement of New Zealand Maori Council v Attorney-General
defined the "Principles of the Treaty" and the proposed sale of government assets was found to be in breach of this proviso. This allowed the courts to consider the Crown's actions in terms of compliance with the Treaty and established the principle that if the Treaty is mentioned in strong terms in a piece of legislation, it takes precedence over other parts of that legislation should they come into conflict. The "Principles of the Treaty" became a common topic in contemporary New Zealand politics, and in 1989, the Fourth Labour Government responded by adopting the "Principles for Crown Action on the Treaty of Waitangi" a similar list of principles to that established in the 1987 court case.

Court system

A Supreme Court was first established in 1841 (it was renamed the High Court in 1980, and is different from the current Supreme Court), and various lower courts subsequently established. Its establishment followed the arrival in New Zealand of the first chief justice, William Martin, and it heard its first case in January 1842. The magistrates' courts came into being in 1846 (replaced by district courts in 1980). The Court of Appeal was set up in 1862 and originally consisted of panels of judges from the Supreme Court. The Court of Appeal was the highest court in New Zealand, although appeals could be taken from this to the Judicial Committee of the Privy Council in London. In 1957 the Court of Appeal was reconstituted to become separate from the Supreme Court, having its own judges. In 2004 a new Supreme Court was established, becoming New Zealand's court of last resort following the simultaneous abolition of the right to appeal to the Privy Council.

In 1865 a Native Land Court was established to "define the land rights of Māori people under Māori custom and to translate those rights or customary titles into land titles recognisable under European law". It has since been heavily criticised for acting as a device for removing Māori from their land. Some of the problems were with the court itself – holding proceedings in English and in cities far from Māori settlements, judges with inadequate knowledge of Māori custom – while others were more to do with the laws it enforced. For example, for many decades land law did not recognise that an entire hapu owned its land, and land ownership was put in the hands of a few people. In 1954 it was renamed the Māori Land Court, and has been substantially reformed since the nineteenth century. Until the mid-twentieth century it also dealt with Māori adoptions.

The New Zealand judiciary have generally been seen as independent and non-corrupt, although not always non-biased. Until recent years they have played a very minor role in developing the law, and as late as 1966 it was said that they "usually follow English decisions scrupulously". In the 1980s the judiciary played a major role in redefining the constitutional position of the Treaty of Waitangi.

New Zealand Bill of Rights Act

The New Zealand Bill of Rights Act was enacted in 1990 to affirm fundamental rights and freedoms set out in the International Covenant on Civil and Political Rights. While the Bill of Rights Act is not a superior law to which all other laws are subject, judges are required to interpret other statutes to be consistent with it if at all possible. If there is an inconsistency, the attorney-general must inform Parliament.

Legal tradition
The New Zealand legal system is heavily based on the English law, and remains similar in many respects. As with all common law countries, English law is organised around the doctrines of precedent (like cases should be decided alike) and stare decisis. These principles dictate that lower courts must follow the decisions of the more senior courts in the judicial hierarchy. This encourages consistency of decision-making.

Contract law
New Zealand contract law was initially derived from the English model. Since 1969, however, a series of Acts of Parliament altered this, and New Zealand contract law is now 'largely... distinct from other jurisdictions'. The main distinction of New Zealand contract law is the wide discretionary power given to courts in granting relief. Although these changes were initially opposed due to fears that they would make the remedy of contractual disputes unpredictable and increase levels of litigation, it is generally agreed that this has not 
happened, and that the laws are working satisfactorily.

Trusts
The Trusts Act 2019 (No 38) came into force on 30 January 2021, so far as it was not already in force. It repealed the Trustee Act 1956 (No 61).

As to charitable trusts, see the Charitable Trusts Act 1957.

See also
 Constitution of New Zealand
 The Laws of New Zealand, an encyclopaedia of law
 List of national legal systems

References

External links

New Zealand Legislation, Parliamentary Counsel Office – up-to-date versions of legislation
Early New Zealand Statutes – assent versions of New Zealand ordinances and statutes passed from 1841 to 1940
NZLII, New Zealand Legal Information Institute – includes databases of court decisions